Format of entries is:
 ICAO (IATA) – Airport Name – Airport Location

OA - Afghanistan

 OAAK – Andkhoy Airport – Andkhoy, Faryab
 OABN (BIN) – Bamyan Airport (Shahid Mazari Airport) – Bamyan
 OABT (BST) – Bost Airport – Lashkargah
 OACC (CCN) – Chaghcharan Airport – Chaghcharan
 OADS (SBF) – Sardeh Band Airport – Sardeh Band, Ghazni
 OADY – Dwyer Airport (military) – Lashkargah
 OADZ (DAZ) – Darwaz Airport – Darwaz
 OAEM – Eshkashem Airport – Ishkashim, Badakhshan
 OAFR (FAH) – Farah Airport – Farah
 OAFZ (FBD) – Fayzabad Airport – Fayzabad

 OAGA – Ghaziabad Airport – Ghaziabad, Nangarhar
 OAGN (GZI) – Ghazni Airport – Ghazni
 OAGZ (GRG) – Gardez Airport – Gardez, Paktia
 OAHN (KWH) – Khwahan Airport – Khwahan
 OAHR (HEA) – Herat International Airport (Khwaja Abdullah Ansari International Airport) – Herat
 OAIX (OAI) – Bagram Airfield – Bagram near Charikar
 OAJL (JAA) – Jalalabad Airport – Jalalabad (currently military only - new civilian airport being planned)
 OAKB (KBL) – Kabul International Airport (Khwaja Rawash Airport) – Kabul
 OAKN (KDH) – Ahmad Shah Baba International Airport – Kandahar
 OAKS (KHT) – Khost Airport – Khost
 OAMK – Muqur Airport – Muqur
 OAMN (MMZ) – Maymana Airport – Maymana
 OAMS (MZR) – Mawlānā Jalāl ad-Din Muhammad Balkhī International Airport – Mazar-i-Sharif
 OANL – Nili Airport – Nili, Daykundi
 OAON (URN) – Urgun Airport – Urgun, Paktia
 OAPJ – Panjab Airport – Panjab, Bamyan
 OAQA (APH) – Qalat Airport – Qalat, Zabul Province
 OAQN (LQN) – Qala i Naw Airport (Qala Nau Airport) – Qala i Naw
 OARG (URZ) – Uruzgan Airport – Khas Uruzgan District, Uruzgan Province
 OARZ (KUR) – Razer Airport – Kuran wa Munjan, Badakhshan
 OASA (OAS) – Sharana Airstrip – Sharana, Paktia
 OASD (OAH) – Shindand Air Base – Shindand, Herat (military)
 OASG – Sheberghan Airfield – Jowzjan Province
 OASL (OLR) – Forward Operating Base Salerno – Khost
 OASN (SGA) – Sheghnan Airport – Shighnan
 OATN (TII) – Tarinkot Airport – Tarinkot (Tereen)
 OATQ (TQN) – Taloqan Airport – Taloqan
 OATW – Taywara Airport – Taywara
 OAUZ (UND) – Kunduz Airport – Kunduz
 OAYQ – Yangi Qaleh Airport – Yangi Qala District, Takhar Province
 OAYW – Yawan Airport – Yawan District, Badakhshan
 OAZI – Camp Bastion Airfield – Helmand near Lashkargah (military)
 OAZJ (ZAJ) – Zaranj Airport – Zaranj

OB - Bahrain

 OBBI (BAH) – Bahrain International Airport – Manama
 OBBS – Sheik Isa Air Base

OE - Saudi Arabia

 OEAA – Abu Ali Airport – Jubail (owned by Aramco)
 OEAB (AHB) – Abha International Airport – Abha
 OEAH (HOF) – al-Ahsa International Airport – Hofuf
 OEAO (ULH) – Prince Abdul Majeed bin Abdulaziz International Airport – Al-'Ula
 OEBA (ABT) – al-Baha Domestic Airport – al-Baha
 OEBH (BHH) – Bisha Domestic Airport – Bisha
 OEBQ – Abqaiq Airport – Abqaiq (owned by Aramco)
 OEDF (DMM) – King Fahd International Airport – Dammam
 OEDR (DHA) – King Abdulaziz Air Base (formerly Dhahran International Airport) – Dhahran
 OEDW – Dawadmi Domestic Airport – Dawadmi
 OEGN (GIZ) – Jizan Regional Airport (King Abdullah bin Abdulaziz Airport) – Gizan (also known as Jizan or Jazan.)
 OEGS (ELQ) – Prince Naif bin Abdulaziz International Airport – Buraidah, Gassim (also known as al Gassim or al Qasim)
 OEGT (URY) – Gurayat Domestic Airport – Gurayat (also known as Guriat)
 OEHL (HAS) – Ha'il Regional Airport – Ha'il
 OEHR – Haradh Airport – Haradh (owned by Aramco)
 OEJB (QJB)– Jubail Airport – Jubail
 OEJL – King Abdulaziz Naval Base – Jubail
 OEJN (JED) – King Abdulaziz International Airport – Jeddah
 OEKK (KMC) – King Khaled Military City Airport – King Khalid Military City
 OEKM (KMX) – King Khalid Air Base – Khamis Mushait
 OEKN – Khurais Airport – Khurais (owned by Aramco)
 OEMA (MED) – Prince Mohammad bin Abdulaziz International Airport – Medina (Mecca)
 OENG (EAM) – Najran Domestic Airport – Najran (also known as Nejran)
 OENN (NUM) – Neom Bay Airport – Neom
 OEPA (AQI) – Al Qaisumah/Hafr Al Batin Airport – Qaisumah (also known as Qaysumah)
 OEPK – IPSA-3 Airport – Al-Sadawi (owned by Aramco)
 OERF (RAH) – Rafha Domestic Airport – Rafha
 OERK (RUH) – King Khalid International Airport – Riyadh
 OERM – Ras Mishab Airport – Ras Mishab (military)
 OERR (RAE) – Arar Domestic Airport – Arar (also known as Ar'ar)
 OERT – Ras Tanura Airport – Ras Tanura (owned by Aramco)
 OERY – Riyadh Air Base – Riyadh (formerly Riyadh International Airport)
 OESB – Shaybah Airport – Shaybah (owned by Aramco)
 OESH (SHW) – Sharurah Domestic Airport – Sharurah (also known as Sharorah)
 OESK (AJF) – Al-Jouf Domestic Airport – al-Jouf (also known as al-Jawf)
 OETB (TUU) – Tabuk Regional Airport (Prince Sultan bin Abdulaziz Airport) – Tabuk
 OETF (TIF) – Ta’if Regional Airport – Ta’if
 OETH – Thumamah Airport – Ath Thumamah
 OETN – Ras Tanajib Airport – Tanajib (owned by Aramco)
 OETR (TUI) – Turaif Domestic Airport – Turaif
 OEUD – Udhayliyah Airport – Udhailiyah (owned by Aramco)
 OEWD (WAE) – Wadi al-Dawasir Domestic Airport – Wadi al-Dawasir
 OEWJ (EJH) – Al Wajh Domestic Airport – Wedjh (also known as Wejh)
 OEYN (YNB) – Yanbu Airport (Prince Abdul Mohsin Bin Abdulaziz International Airport) – Yanbu (also known as Yenbo)

OI - Iran

 OIAA (ABD) – Ayatollah Jami International Airport – Abadan
 OIAD (DEF) – Dezful Airport – Dezful
 OIAE – Behbahan Airport – Behbahan
 OIAH (GCH) – Gachsaran Airport – Dogonbadan
 OIAI – Shahid Asiyaee Airport – Masjed Soleyman
 OIAJ (OMI) – Omidiyeh Air Base – Omidiyeh
 OIAM (MRX) – Mahshahr Airport – Mahshahr
 OIAW (AWZ) – Ahvaz International Airport (Lieutenant General Qasem Soleimani International Airport) – Ahwaz
 OIBA (AEU) – Abu Musa Airport – Abu Musa
 OIBB (BUZ) – Bushehr Airport – Bushehr
 OIBH (IAQ) – Bastak Air Base – Bastak
 OIBI (YEH) – Asalouyeh Airport – Asalouyeh (military)
 OIBJ (KNR) – Jam Airport – Bandar Kangan
 OIBK (KIH) – Kish International Airport – Kish Island
 OIBL (BDH) – Bandar Lengeh Airport – Bandar Lengeh
 OIBP (PGU) –Persian Gulf Airport – Khalije Fars, Assaluyeh
 OIBQ (KHK) – Khark Airport – Kharg
 OIBS (SXI) – Sirri Island Airport – Sirri Island
 OIBV (LVP) – Lavan Airport – Lavan Island
 OIBX – Tunb Airport – Greater and Lesser Tunbs
 OICC (KSH) – Kermanshah Airport (Shahid Ashrafi Esfahani Airport) – Kermanshah
 OICD – Abdanan Airport – Abdanan
 OICI (IIL) – Ilam Airport – Ilam
 OICK (KHD) – Khorramabad International Airport – Khorramabad
 OICS (SDG) – Sanandaj Airport – Sanandaj
 OIFE (IFH) – Hesa Air Base – Isfahan (Esfahan)
 OIFK (KKS) – Kashan Airport – Kashan
 OIFP – Badr Air Base – Isfahan (Esfahan)
 OIFM (IFN) – Isfahan International Airport (Esfahan Shahid Beheshti Int'l) – Isfahan (Esfahan)
 OIFS (CQD) – Shahrekord International Airport – Shahrekord
 OIGG (RAS) – Rasht Airport (Sardar Jangal Airport) – Rasht
 OIHH (HDM) – Hamadan International Airport – Hamadan
 OIHR (AJK) – Arak International Airport – Arak
 OIHS (NUJ) – Hamedan Air Base (Shahrokhi Air Base) – Hamadan
 OIIA – Qazvin-Azadi Airport – Qarpuzabad
 OIIC – Kushke Nosrat Airport – Qom Province
 OIID – Doshan Tappeh Air Base – Tehran
 OIIE (IKA) – Imam Khomeini International Airport – Tehran
 OIIG – Ghale Morghi Airport – Tehran
 OIII (THR) – Mehrabad International Airport – Tehran
 OIIK (GZW) – Qazvin Airport – Qazvin
 OIIP (PYK) – Payam International Airport – Karaj
 OIIQ – Qom International Airport – Qom (under construction)
 OIIR – Garmsar Airport – Garmsar
 OIIS (SNX) – Semnan Municipal Airport – Semnan
 OIKB (BND) – Bandar Abbas International Airport – Bandar Abbas
 OIKJ (JYR) – Jiroft Airport – Jiroft
 OIKK (KER) – Kerman Airport (Ayatollah Hashemi Rafsanjani Airport) – Kerman
 OIKM (BXR) – Bam Airport – Bam
 OIKP (HDR) – Havadarya Airport – Bandar Abbas
 OIKQ (GSM) – Qeshm International Airport – Dayrestan
 OIKR (RJN) – Rafsanjan Airport – Rafsanjan
 OIKY (SYJ) – Sirjan Airport – Sirjan
 OIMB (XBJ) – Birjand Airport – Birjand
 OIMC (CKT) – Sarakhs Airport – Sarakhs
 OIMJ (RUD) – Shahroud Airport – Shahrud
 OIMM (MHD) – Mashhad International Airport (Shahid Hashemi Nejad Airport) – Mashhad
 OIMN (BJB) – Bojnourd Airport – Bojnourd
 OIMQ – Kashmar UltraLight Airport – Kashmar
 OIMS (AFZ) – Sabzevar Airport – Sabzevar
 OIMT (TCX) – Tabas Airport – Tabas
 OIND – Babolsar Airport – Babolsar
 OINE (KLM) – Kalaleh Airport – Kalaleh
 OING (GBT) – Gorgan Airport – Gorgan
 OINJ (BSM) – Bishe Kola Air Base – Amol
 OINN (NSH) – Noshahr Airport – Noshahr
 OINR (RZR) – Ramsar International Airport – Ramsar
 OINZ (SRY) – Dasht-e Naz Airport – Sari
 OISA – Abadeh Airport – Abadeh
 OISD – Darab Airport – Darab
 OISF (FAZ) – Fasa Airport – Fasa
 OISJ (JAR) – Jahrom Airport – Jahrom
 OISL (LRR) – Larestan International Airport – Lar
 OISO – Zarqan Airport – Zarqan
 OISR (LFM) – Lamerd International Airport – Lamerd
 OISS (SYZ) – Shiraz International Airport (Shiraz Shahid Dastghaib Int'l) – Shiraz
 OISY (YES) – Yasuj Airport – Yasuj
 OISZ – Firuzabad Airport – Firuzabad
 OITH (KHA) – Khaneh Airport – Piranshahr (Khaneh)
 OITK (KHY) – Khoy Airport – Khoy
 OITL (ADU) – Ardabil Airport – Ardabil
 OITP (PFQ) – Parsabad-Moghan Airport – Parsabad
 OITR (OMH) – Urmia Airport – Urmia
 OITT (TBZ) – Tabriz International Airport – Tabriz
 OITU (IMQ) – Maku International Airport – Maku
 OITZ (JWN) – Zanjan Airport – Zanjan
 OIYY (AZD) – Shahid Sadooghi Airport – Yazd
 OIZB (ACZ) – Zabol Airport – Zabol
 OIZC (ZBR) – Chabahar/Konarak International Airport – Chabahar
 OIZH (ZAH) – Zahedan International Airport – Zahedan
 OIZI (IHR) – Iranshahr Airport – Iranshahr
 OIZJ (JSK) – Jask Airport – Jask
 OIZS – Saravan Airport – Saravan

OJ - Jordan

 OJAI (AMM) – Queen Alia International Airport – Amman
 OJAM (ADJ) – Marka International Airport – Amman
 OJAQ (AQJ) – King Hussein International Airport – Aqaba
 OJJR (JRS) – Jerusalem International Airport, under Jordan from 1948 till 1967, closed since the Second Intifada – West Bank
 OJMF (OMF) – King Hussein Air Base, Mafraq – Mafraq Governorate

OK - Kuwait

 OKAJ – Ahmad al-Jaber Air Base
 OKAS – Ali Al Salem Air Base
 OKKK (KWI) – Kuwait International Airport – Al-Maqwa, near Kuwait City
 OKDI – Udairi Army Airfield – Camp Buehring

OL - Lebanon

 OLBA (BEY) – Beirut Air Base/Rafic Hariri International Airport (formerly Beirut International Airport) – Beirut
 OLKA (KYE) – Rene Mouawad Air Base – Kleyate
 OLRA – Rayak Air Base – Rayak

OM - United Arab Emirates

 OMAA (AUH) – Abu Dhabi International Airport – Abu Dhabi
 OMAB – Buhasa Airport – Buhasa
 OMAD (AZI) – Bateen Airport – Abu Dhabi
 OMAF – Futaysi Airport – Al Futaisi
 OMAJ – Jebel Dhana Airport – Jebel Dhana
 OMAL (AAN) – Al Ain International Airport – Al Ain
 OMAM (DHF) – Al Dhafra Air Base – Muqatra
 OMAQ – Qarnayn Airport – Qarnayn
 OMAR – Arzanah Airport – Arzanah
 OMAS – Das Island Airport – Das Island
 OMAZ (AUH) – Zirku Airport – Zirku Island
 OMBY (XSB) – Sir Bani Yas Airport – Sir Bani Yas
 OMDB (DXB) – Dubai International Airport – Dubai
 OMDL (ZDY) – Dalma Airport – Dalma
 OMDM (DXB) – Al Minhad Air Base – Dubai
 OMDW (DWC) – Al Maktoum International Airport (Dubai World Central Airport) – Dubai
 OMFJ (FJR) – Fujairah International Airport – Fujairah
 OMNK (XXX) – Sas Al Nakheel Air Base – Abu Dhabi
 OMRJ – Al Jazeirah Airport (private) – Al Jazirah Al Hamra
 OMRK (RKT) – Ras Al Khaimah International Airport – Ras al-Khaimah
 OMRS – Al Saqr Field Airport (private) – Ras al-Khaimah
 OMSJ (SHJ) – Sharjah International Airport – Sharjah

OO - Oman

 OOAD (AOM) – Adam Airport (proposed civil airport) – Adam
 OOBB – Butabul Airport – Ramlat Bu Tabul
 OOBR (RMB) – Buraimi Airport – Al-Buraimi
 OODQ (DQM) – Duqm International Airport – Duqm
 OOFD (FAU) – Fahud Airport – Fahud
 OOGB (RNM) – Qarn Alam Airport – Qarn Alam
 OOHA – Haima Airport – Haima
 OOIA – Ibra Airport – Ibra
 OOII – Ibri Airport – Ibri
 OOIZ – Izki Air Base – Izki
 OOJA (JNJ) – Ja'Aluni Airport – Duqm
 OOKB (KHS) – Khasab Airport/Khasab Air Base – Khasab
 OOLK (LKW) – Lekhwair Airport – Lekhwair
 OOMA (MSH) – RAFO Masirah – Masirah
 OOMK (UKH) – Mukhaizna Airport – Mukhaizna Oil Field
 OOMN – RAFO Musannah – Barka
 OOMS (MCT) – Muscat International Airport – Muscat
 OOMX (OMM) – Marmul Airport – Marmul Heavy Oil Field
 OORH – Ras al Hadd Airport – Ras al Hadd
 OORQ (MNH) – Rustaq Airport – Rustaq
 OOSA (SLL) – Salalah International Airport – Salalah
 OOSH (OHS) – Sohar International Airport – Sohar
 OOSQ – Saiq Airport – Saiq
 OOSR (SUH) – Sur Airport – Sur
 OOTH (TTH) – RAFO Thumrait – Thumrait
 OOYB – Yibal Airport – Yibal

OP - Pakistan

 OPBN (BNP) – Bannu Airport – Bannu
 OPBW (BHV) – Bahawalpur Airport – Bahawalpur
 OPCH (CJL) – Chitral Airport – Chitral
 OPCL (CHB) – Chilas Airport – Chilas
 OPDB (DBA) – Dalbandin Airport – Dalbandin
 OPDG (DEA) – Dera Ghazi Khan Airport – Dera Ghazi Khan
 OPDI (DSK) – Dera Ismail Khan Airport – Dera Ismail Khan
 OPFA (LYP) – Faisalabad International Airport – Faisalabad
 OPGD (GWD) – Gwadar International Airport – Gwadar
 OPGT (GIL) – Gilgit Airport – Gilgit
 OPIS (ISB) – Islamabad International Airport – Islamabad-Rawalpindi
 OPJA (JAG) – PAF Base Shahbaz (Jacobabad Airport) – Jacobabad
 OPJI (JIW) – Jiwani Airport – Jiwani
 OPKC (KHI) – Jinnah International Airport – Karachi
 OPKD (HDD) – Hyderabad Airport – Hyderabad
 OPKH (KDD) – Khuzdar Airport – Khuzdar
 OPKT (OHT) – PAF Base Kohat – Kohat
 OPKW (KCF) – Kadanwari Airport – Kadanwari gas field
 OPLA (LHE) – Allama Iqbal International Airport – Lahore
 OPLH – Walton Airport – Lahore
 OPMA (XJM) – Mangla Airport – Mangla
 OPMF (MFG) – Muzaffarabad Airport – Muzaffarabad
 OPMI (MWD) – PAF Base M.M. Alam – Mianwali
 OPMJ (MJD) – Moenjodaro Airport – Mohenjo-daro
 OPMP (MPD) – Sindhri Airport – Sindhri
 OPMR (MSR) – PAF Base Masroor (Karachi Air Base) – Karachi
 OPMS (MNS) – PAF Base Minhas (Kamra Air Base) – Kamra
 OPMT (MUX) – Multan International Airport – Multan
 OPNH (WNS) – Nawabshah Airport – Nawabshah
 OPOR (ORW) – Ormara Airport – Ormara
 OPPC (PAJ) – Parachinar Airport – Parachinar
 OPPG (PJG) – Panjgur Airport – Panjgur
 OPPI (PSI) – Pasni Airport – Pasni City
 OPPS (PEW) – Bacha Khan International Airport – Peshawar
 OPQS (DHM) – Dhamial Army Airbase – Rawalpindi
 OPQT (UET) – Quetta International Airport – Quetta
 OPRK (RYK) – Shaikh Zayed International Airport – Rahim Yar Khan
 OPRN (NRK) – PAF Base Nur Khan – Rawalpindi
 OPRQ (RAF) – PAF Base Rafiqui (Shorkot Air Base) – Shorkot
 OPRS – PAF Academy – Risalpur
 OPRT (RAZ) – Rawalakot Airport – Rawalakot
 OPSF (FSL) – PAF Base Faisal – Karachi
 OPSB (SBQ) – Sibi Airport – Sibi
 OPSD (KDU) – Skardu Airport – Skardu
 OPSK (SKD) – Sukkur Airport (Begum Nusrat Bhutto Airport Sukkur) – Sukkur
 OPSN (SYW) – Sehwan Sharif Airport – Sehwan Sharif
 OPSR (MSF) – PAF Base Mushaf (Sargodha Air Base) – Sargodha
 OPSS (SDT) – Saidu Sharif Airport – Saidu Sharif
 OPST (SKT) – Sialkot International Airport – Sialkot
 OPSU (SUL) – Sui Airport – Sui
 OPSW (RZS) – Sawan Airport – Sawan Gas Field
 OPSX (SWN) – Sahiwal Airport – Sahiwal (maybe defunct)
 OPTA (TLB) – Tarbela Dam Airport – Tarbela Dam
 OPTU (TUK) – Turbat International Airport – Turbat
 OPZB (PZH) – Zhob Airport – Zhob

OR - Iraq

 ORAA (IQA) – Al Asad Airbase – Al Anbar
 ORAI – Al Iskandariya Airport – Iskandariya
 ORAN – An Numaniyah Airport – An Numaniyah
 ORAT – Al Taqaddum Airbase – Habbaniyah
 ORBB (BMN) – Bamarni Airport – Bamarni
 ORBD – Balad Air Base (Al-Bakir Airbase) – Balad
 ORBI (BGW) – Baghdad International Airport – Baghdad (changed from ORBS in 2003)
 ORBM (OSM) – Mosul International Airport – Mosul
 ORBR – Bashur Airport – Iraqi Kurdistan
 ORER (EBL) – Erbil International Airport – Erbil (Hewlêr),
 ORJA – Jalibah Southeast Air Base – Jalibah
 ORKK (KIK) – Kirkuk Airport (Al-Hurriya Air Base) – Kirkuk
 ORMM (BSR) – Basrah International Airport – Basrah
 ORNI (NJF) – Al Najaf International Airport – Najaf
 ORQT – Qasr Tall Airport – Qasr Tal Mihl
 ORQW – Qayyarah Airfield West – Qayyarah
 ORSH – Camp Speicher (Majid al Tamimi Airbase/Tikrit Air Academy) – Tikrit
 ORSU – Sulaimaniyah International Airport – Sulaimaniyah (Silêmanî), Iraqi Kurdistan
 ORTF – Tal Afar Air Base – Tal Afar
 ORTI – Camp Taji (Camp Cooke) – Taji
 ORTK – Tikrit East Airport – Tikrit
 ORTL (XNH) – Nasiriyah International Airport (formerly Tallil Air Base) – Nasiriyah
 ORTS – Tikrit South Airport – Tikrit
 ORUB – Ubaydah Bin Al Jarrah Air Base – Al-Kut
 ORUQ – Umm Qasr Airport – Umm Qasr

OS - Syria

 OSAP (ALP) – Aleppo International Airport – Aleppo
 OSDI (DAM) – Damascus International Airport – Damascus
 OSDZ (DEZ) – Deir ez-Zor Airport – Deir ez-Zor
 OSKL (KAC) – Qamishli Airport – Qamishli
 OSLK (LTK) – Bassel Al-Assad International Airport – Latakia
 OSPR (PMS) – Palmyra Airport – Palmyra

OT - Qatar

 OTBD (DIA) – Doha International Airport – Doha
 OTBH – Al Udeid Air Base (Abu Nakhlah Airport) – Doha
 OTBK – Al Khor Airport – Al Khor
 OTHH (DOH) – Hamad International Airport – Doha

OY - Yemen

 OYAA (ADE) – Aden International Airport – Aden
 OYAB (EAB) – Abbs Airport – Abbs
 OYAT (AXK) – Ataq Airport – Ataq
 OYBI (BYD) – Al Bayda' Airport – Al Bayda
 OYBN (BHN) – Beihan Airport – Beihan
 OYBQ (BUK) – Albuq Airport – Al Bough
 OYGD (AAY) – Al Ghaydah Airport – Al-Ghaidah
 OYKM (KAM) – Kamaran Airport – Kamaran
 OYHD (HOD) – Hodeidah International Airport – Hodeidah
 OYMB (MYN) – Marib Airport (construction suspended) – Marib
 OYMK (UKR) – Mukeiras Airport – Mukeiras
 OYQN (IHN) – Qishn Airport – Qishn
 OYRN (RIY) – Riyan International Airport – Mukalla
 OYSH (SYE) – Saadah Airport – Saadah
 OYSN (SAH) – Sanaa International Airport – Sana'a
 OYSQ (SCT) – Socotra Airport – Socotra
 OYSY (GXF) – Seiyun Hadhramaut Airport – Sayun
 OYTZ (TAI) – Ta'izz International Airport – Taiz
 OYZM – Al Hazm Airport – Al Hazm

References

 
  - includes IATA codes
 Aviation Safety Network - IATA and ICAO airport codes

O
Airport by ICAO code
Airport by ICAO code
Airport by ICAO code
Airport by ICAO code
Airport by ICAO code
Airport by ICAO code
Airports by ICAO code
Airport by ICAO code
Airport by ICAO code
Airport by ICAO code
Airports by ICAO code
Airport by ICAO code
Airports by ICAO code
Airport by ICAO code